The Guinea national basketball team represents Guinea in international basketball competitions. It is administrated by the Fédération Guinéenne de Basket-Ball (FGBB).

Guinea has played at the AfroBasket six times, with its best performance being a fourth place in 1962.

History

Establishment as an African pioneer (1962)
Guinea was one of five countries that participated at the African Championship 1962 in Cairo, Egypt.
Guinea's fourth place finish there remains its best result at the AfroBasket.

Three Afrobasket qualifications in 50 years (1964–2015)
After the inauguration tournament, Guinea almost completely disappeared from the Afrobasket.
The only exception was the time 1980–1985 where the team qualified for the Afrobasket on 3 out of 4 occasions.

Cedric Mansare becomes the leading player (2017–2020)
For the AfroBasket 2017 qualification, Cedric Mansare made his debut for the team. The 35-year-old guard has become the go-to player for Guinea ever since.
After a surprising Qualifiers campaign, in which they beat former champion and medal contender Senegal, Guinea finished the regional play-off tied with Mali (3–3) in second place, but the Guineans fell short of automatic qualification for the Final Round due to a lower goal-average. Senegal and Mali secured automatic, Cape Verde was eliminated, but Guinea was awarded a wild card – along with Rwanda.
The FIBA AfroBasket 2017 marked Guinea's first appearance in the tournament in more than 32 years.

Unexpected success (2021)
At the AfroBasket 2021 qualification, with Guinea needing to beat Equatorial Guinea in the final day of the Qualifiers, Cedric Mansare made four of his eight three-pointers attempts to finish with a team-high 18 points in the 80–71 victory.
Throughout the campaign, Mansare averaged 11.5 points per game. Joining Mansare as Guinea central players, were power forward Ousmane Dramé, who contributed 8.2 rebounds in six games,  and guard Ahmed Doumbia. 
Ahmed Doumbia only played the last three games of the Qualifiers, but he was immense for Guinea, averaging 13 points and 5.7 assists. With Guinea on the brink of elimination, Doumbia explained why he didn't want to miss such opportunity. "We want to bring our flag to the AfroBasket, putting our country on the basketball map. This is my main motivation."

Željko Zečević takes over (2021–present)
In 2021, the team qualified again. This was accomplished under the Serbian head coach Željko Zečević who replaced Frenchman Michel Perrin at the helm ahead of the decisive last window of the Qualifiers in February 2021. 
As of 2021, Zečević had coaching experience not only as head coach of Egypt at the AfroBasket 2009 but he had also managed a number of African clubs.
Some of his coaching highlights in African included a Second-Place in the 2019 FIBA AfroLeague at the helm of Morocco's AS Sale. Zečević had further led US Monastir to the Third-Place of the 2017 FIBA Africa Clubs Champions Cup.

At the AfroBasket 2021 in Kigali, Guinea was drawn in Group B alongside Central African Republic, Egypt and Tunisia, which are three former AfroBasket champions.
Guinea entered as the lowest-ranked of the 16-team AfroBasket 2021 line-up.
Yet, they finished 8th out of 16, Guinea's best placement in almost 60 years.

Performance at AfroBasket

Guinea has played at the AfroBasket (formerly the FIBA Africa Championship) six times, with its first appearance during the inaugural season in 1962. Its first appearance was its best one as the team finished in fourth place. After 18 years of absence, Guinea returned to the tournament in 1980 and later played in the 1983 and 1985 editions. After another 22 years of absence, the team returned in 2017. In the 2021 tournament, which Guinea qualified for through a wild card, they reached the quarter-finals for the first time.

 Fourth place

Team

Current roster
Roster for the AfroBasket 2021.

Past rosters
Roster for the AfroBasket 2017.

|}
| valign="top" |
Head coach
 Ousmane Tafsir Camara
Assistant coaches
 Ansoumane Toure

Legend
Club – describes lastclub before the tournament
Age – describes ageon 6 September 2017
|}

At the 2015 Afrobasket qualification:

|}

| valign="top" |

Head coach

Assistant coaches

Legend

Club – describes lastclub before the tournament
Age – describes ageon 19 August 2015

|}

Under-18 team
At the 2020 FIBA Africa Under-18 Championship in Cairo, Egypt, the Guineans finished fourth. The team was coached by Željko Zečević who later became head coach of Guinea's senior team.

Kit
2015 – Adidas

References

External links

FIBA profile
Guinea Basketball Records at FIBA Archive
Africabasket – Guinea Men National Team 

Men's national basketball teams
Basketball
Basketball in Guinea
1962 establishments in Guinea
Basketball teams established in 1962